Songs of Our Fathers is an album by American musicians David Grisman and Andy Statman, released in 1995. It's a collection of Jewish songs, many of which are more than 100 years old. Much of the music is influenced by the Jewish instrumental folk music of Eastern Europe known as Klezmer.

Track listing
All songs traditional except for tracks 2a, 3, 7, and 9 by Shlomo Carlebach and track 5 by Andy Statman.
 "Shalom Aleichem"
 "Chassidic Medley: Adir Hu/Moshe Emes"
 "Shomer Yisrael" 
 "Toska"
 "Bashie's Bounce"
 "Dovid Melech Yisrael"
 "Shabbos Waltz"
 "For the Sake of My Brothers and Friends"
 "Der Rebbe"
 "Adon Olam"
 "Kazatski"
 "Shalom Aleichem"

Personnel
David Grisman – mandolin
Andy Statman – clarinet, mandolin
 Hal Blaine – drums
 Edgar Meyer – bass
 Zachariah Spellman – tuba
 Enrique Coria – guitar
 Jim Kerwin – bass

References

1995 albums
David Grisman albums
Jewish music albums